{{DISPLAYTITLE:C18H16N2O3}}
The molecular formula C18H16N2O3 (molar mass: 308.3329  g/mol) may refer to:

 Amfonelic_acid
 Citrus_Red_2
 Roquinimex

Molecular formulas